Mamannar Kalingarayan Anicut is a dam constructed on the Bhavani river (tributary of Kaveri River) in the South Indian state of Tamil Nadu. It is located just before Kooduthurai where Bhavani combines with Cauvery, in Bhavani, Erode.

History
The anicut was constructed in the 13th century by the Kongu Tamil Chieftain Mamannar Kalingarayan Gounder and his birth name is Lingaiya Gounder. This irrigation project involved the construction of a dam and barrage to divert the water to Kalingarayan Canal. It is one of the ancient River linking project, which established the link between Bhavani river and Noyyal river. The Kalingarayan Anicut was built in 1283.

Improvements
In 2016, the Government of Tamil Nadu undertook a development to strengthen the dam's embankments by concrete plugging.

Tourism promotion
The Government of Tamil Nadu planned to convert the dam into a tourist attraction. It is designed to have a children's park, along with a memorial hall and statue, expected to open in 2017.

References

Buildings and structures in Erode district
Tourist attractions around Erode
Dams in Tamil Nadu
Bhavani River
Water Heritage Sites in India